The Atheist's wager, coined by the philosopher Michael Martin and published in his 1990 book Atheism: A Philosophical Justification, is an atheistic response to Pascal's wager regarding the existence of God.

One version of the Atheist's wager suggests that since a kind and loving god would reward good deeds – and that if no gods exist, good deeds would still leave a positive legacy – one should live a good life without religion. Another formulation suggests that a god may reward honest disbelief and punish a dishonest belief in the divine.

Explanation
Martin's wager states that if one were to analyze their options in regard to how to live their life, they would arrive at the following possibilities:
You may live a good life and believe in a god, and a benevolent god exists, in which case you go to heaven: your gain is infinite.
You may live a good life without believing in a god, and a benevolent god exists, in which case you go to heaven: your gain is infinite.
You may live a good life and believe in a god, but no benevolent god exists, in which case you leave a positive legacy to the world; your gain is finite.
You may live a good life without believing in a god, and no benevolent god exists, in which case you leave a positive legacy to the world; your gain is finite.
You may live an evil life and believe in a god, and a benevolent god exists, in which case you go to hell: your loss is infinite.
You may live an evil life without believing in a god, and a benevolent god exists, in which case you go to hell: your loss is infinite.
You may live an evil life and believe in a god, but no benevolent god exists, in which case you leave a negative legacy to the world; your loss is finite.
You may live an evil life without believing in a god, and no benevolent god exists, in which case you leave a negative legacy to the world; your loss is finite.

The following table shows the values assigned to each possible outcome:

Given these values, Martin argues that the option to live a good life clearly dominates the option of living an evil life, regardless of belief in a god. Whether one believes in god has no effect on the outcome.

References

Arguments against the existence of God
Religious ethics
Thought experiments in ethics